Arts et Métiers tram stop is located on line  of the tramway de Bordeaux.

Location 
The station is located on the avenue des Facultés at Talence in the university area.

Junctions 
 Buses of the TBC:

Close by
 Université Bordeaux 1
 Bibliothèque Universitaire Sciences
 ENSAM
 ENSEIRB-MATMECA
 Parking relais Arts et Métiers

See also 
 TBC
 Tramway de Bordeaux

External links 
 

Bordeaux tramway stops
Tram stops in Talence
Railway stations in France opened in 2004